Amlaíb Cenncairech was a Norse ruler and presumably King of Limerick notable for his military activities in Ireland in the 930s, especially in the province of Connacht and apparently even in Ulster and Leinster. This period, the 920s and 930s, is commonly regarded as the very height of Norse power in Ireland, and was when Limerick essentially equalled Dublin in power.

His epithet Cennc(h)airech is commonly translated into the unflattering "Scabby-Head" but this may be inaccurate. The adjective cairech actually means, according to the Dictionary of the Irish Language, "criminal; guilty; sinful", and thus Cennc(h)airech may be translated "Sinful Head".

Career
Amlaíb is mentioned by name only in the Annals of the Four Masters and Annals of Clonmacnoise. Historians believe the dating in both cases is off. In general, the sources for western Ireland's history are not great. The Chronicon Scotorum records several of the same and related events but does not mention Amlaíb by name.

Annals of the Four Masters
The Annals of the Four Masters are generally off by two years.

Capture or recruitment?

The traditional interpretation of these notices, the second immediately following the first in the manuscripts, is that what Amlaíb mac Gofraid was actually doing was compelling or recruiting Amlaíb Cenncairech for his upcoming battle with Athelstan of England. This was the Battle of Brunanburh.

More recent historians tend to interpret this as the culmination of an extended conflict between the Norse of Dublin and Limerick, dating from the arrival of Tomrair mac Ailchi in 922. They assume that the two Amlaíbs actually engaged in a battle and that mac Gofraid won a "decisive victory" over Cenncairech, effectively ending Limerick as a major player in Ireland for the next two or three decades.

Annals of Clonmacnoise
It is uncertain but likely that Cenncairech soon succeeded Colla ua Bairid, who died in 932, as King of the Limerick Norse, and thus it is likely he was involved in the events of 933.

Again the expedition to England follows, but here no mention is made of any conflict with Dublin.

Chronicon Scotorum
Again here no mention is made of any conflict with Dublin.

Irish saga
A certain Amlaíb of Limerick features as a character in the 12th century saga and propaganda tract Caithréim Chellacháin Chaisil, who is killed by Cellachán Caisil himself. Alexander Bugge takes no position regarding his historicity, but offers Amlaíb Cenncairech as his primary example of an historical Amlaíb associated with Limerick. Donnchadh Ó Corráin allows that "The Amlaíb of the text may be a vague memory of Amlaíb Cennchairech but it must be remembered that Amlaíb is one of the commonest Viking names in Ireland."

Bugge does believe that this Amlaíb of Limerick can be identified as the father of the Amlaíb mac Amlaíb mentioned in the Cogad Gáedel re Gallaib as an ally of Ivar of Limerick. According to this saga and propaganda tract (dated near contemporary with the Caithréim Chellacháin Chaisil), Amlaíb mac Amlaíb was banished along with Ivar following the Norse loss at the Battle of Sulcoit against the Dál gCais led by Mathgamain mac Cennétig in 967. The two are said to have "attempted the conquest of Britain" together, apparently without success, as Amlaíb "was killed by the king of Britain" and Ivar soon after reestablished himself in Limerick.

See also
 Donnubán mac Cathail, possible Irish grandson of Amlaíb

Notes

References

 Bugge, Alexander (ed. & tr.), Caithreim Cellachain Caisil. Christiania: J. Chr. Gundersens Bogtrykkeri. 1905.
 Downham, Clare, Viking Kings of Britain and Ireland: The Dynasty of Ívarr to A.D. 1014. Edinburgh: Dunedin. 2007.
 Haliday, Charles, The Scandinavian Kingdom of Dublin. Dublin: Alex Thom & Co. 1882.
 Lee, Timothy, "The Northmen of Limerick", in Journal of the Royal Historical and Archaeological Association of Ireland, Fourth Series, Vol. 9, No. 80 (Jul. – Oct., 1889): 227–231. JSTOR
 Mac Niocaill, Gearóid (ed. & tr.), Chronicon Scotorum. Unpublished manuscript. edition and translation
 MacGeoghegan, Connell (trans.), Denis Murphy (ed.), The Annals of Clonmacnoise. Translated 1627. Printed in Dublin by The University Press in 1896.
 Ó Corráin, Donnchadh, "Caithréim Chellacháin Chaisil: History or Propaganda?", in Ériu 25 (1974): 1–69.
 O'Donovan, John (ed. & tr.), Annala Rioghachta Eireann. Annals of the Kingdom of Ireland by the Four Masters. 7 vols. Dublin: Royal Irish Academy. 1848-51. 2nd edition, 1856. Volume II
 Shetelig, Haakon, Viking Antiquities in Great Britain and Ireland, Volume I. Oslo: H. Aschehoug & Co. 1940.
 Steenstrup, Johannes C. H. R., Normannerne, Vols. 3–4. Copenhagen: Forlagt af Rudolph Klein, I. Cohens Bogtrykkeri. 1882. alternative scan
 Thornton, David E., "Clann Eruilb: Irish or Scandinavian?", in Irish Historical Studies Vol. 30, No. 118 (Nov., 1996): 161–166. JSTOR
 Todd, James Henthorn (ed. & tr.), Cogadh Gaedhel re Gallaibh: The War of the Gaedhil with the Gaill. London: Longmans. 1867.

Kings of Limerick
Viking rulers
10th-century Irish monarchs
10th-century Vikings